Abd Mohd Khalid Mohd Ali also known as Khalid Ali is a Malaysian footballer who played for Selangor FA as a midfielder in the late 1970s and in the 1980s. He also a football critic.

International career 
Khalid Ali start representing Malaysia in competition from 1977 to 1985. He brought into the senior team by Karl Heinz Weigang. He was a key player to the Malaysian team who qualified to the 1980 Olympic games Moscow which Malaysia boycotted. Malaysia won the play-off against South Korea with a 2–1 score in the Merdeka Stadium.

Personal life
His youngest brother also a professional footballer Zainal Abidin Hassan.

Honours

Club
Selangor FA
 First Division
 Champion: 1984
 Malaysia Cup
Winners: 1976, 1978, 1979, 1984
 Charity Cup (Sultan Haji Ahmad Shah Cup)
 Winner: 1985

International
 SEA Games
Winners: 1979

Individual
 AFC Asian All Stars: 1982

References 

1957 births
Living people
Malaysian people of Malay descent
Malaysian people of Kenyan descent
Malaysia international footballers
Malaysian expatriate footballers
Selangor FA players
Southeast Asian Games gold medalists for Malaysia
Southeast Asian Games medalists in football
Competitors at the 1979 Southeast Asian Games
Malaysian footballers
Association footballers not categorized by position